John Clifford Green is an American academic who has written numerous books on the relationship between religion and politics.

Education
John Clifford Green received his B.A. degree from the University of Colorado and his Ph.D. degree from Cornell University.

Academic career
Green is a scholar, researcher, and director of the Ray C. Bliss Institute of Applied Politics at the University of Akron in Ohio. He is also a Distinguished Professor of Political Science at the University of Akron. His area of research is religion and politics in the U.S. He co-authored the book Mormons and American Politics with Quin Monson and David E. Campbell. He was appointed dean of the Buchtel College of Arts and Sciences by the Board of Trustees on April 19, 2017, after serving as interim dean since October 2015. Following the resignation of The University of Akron's 17th President, Matthew Wilson, Green was named interim president of the university by the Board of Trustees on April 18, 2018. Green's term as interim president began on May 1, 2018, and ended on October 1, 2019.

Honors
Green is a Senior Fellow at the Pew Forum on Religion & Public Life.

Bibliography
(1991) The Bible and the Ballot Box: Religion and Politics in the 1988 Election  (Westview Press)
(1993) Machine politics, Sound Bites, and Nostalgia: On Studying Political Parties  (University Press of America)
(1994) Politics, Professionalism, and Power: Modern Party Organization and the Legacy of Ray C. Bliss (University Press of America)
(1994) Representing Interests and Interest Group Representation (University Press of America)
(1996) Religion and the Culture Wars: Dispatches From the Front (Rowman & Littlefield)
(1997) The Bully Pulpit: The Politics of Protestant Clergy (University Press of Kansas)
(1999) Financing the 1996 Elections (M.E. Sharpe)
(2000) Prayers in the Precincts: the Christian Right in the 1998 Elections (Georgetown University Press)
(2001) The Politics of Ideas: Intellectual Challenges to the Major Parties (State University of New York Press)
(2001) Superintending Democracy: The Courts and the Political Process (University of Akron Press)
(2002) Responsible Partisanship?: The Evolution of American Political Parties Since 1950 (University Press of Kansas)
(2002) Multiparty Politics in America: Prospects and Performance (Rowman & Littlefield)
(2003) The Christian Right in American Politics: Marching to the Millennium (Georgetown University Press)
(2003) The State of the Parties: The Changing Role of Contemporary Party Politics (Rowman & Littlefield)
(2003) The Test of Time: Coping with Legislative Term Limits (Lexington Books)
(2005) The Final Arbiter: The Consequences of Bush v. Gore for Law and Politics (State University of New York Press)
(2006) The Values Campaign?: The Christian Right and the 2004 Elections (Georgetown University Press)
(2007) Fountain of Youth: Strategies and Tactics for Mobilizing America's Young Voters  (Rowman & Littlefield)
(2010) The Faith Factor: How Religion Influences American Elections (Potomac Books Inc.) at Amazon.

Publications
(2004) American Religious Landscape and Political Attitudes: A Baseline for 2004

References

External links
John Green's Faculty Profile at the University of Akron
Ray C. Bliss Institute of Applied Politics

Year of birth missing (living people)
Living people
Cornell University alumni
Political science educators
Religion and politics
University of Akron faculty
University of Colorado alumni